William Frederick Roland (born March 5, 1989) better known as Will Roland is an American actor and singer, best known for originating the role of Jared Kleinman in the Broadway musical Dear Evan Hansen, for which he received a Grammy and Daytime Emmy Award. On film, he is known for his role in the drama film One Penny. Most recently, he played the lead role of Jeremy Heere in the musical Be More Chill both off-Broadway and on Broadway.

Early life
William Frederick Roland was born in New York City to Beth and William J. Roland, who co-own Roland Antiques, an auction house. He initially lived in Greenwich Village before moving to Locust Valley, Long Island at the age of eight. He attended Friends Academy for middle school and high school. Roland graduated from New York University in 2011 with a degree in musical theater from Steinhardt School of Culture, Education, and Human Development.

Career 
Roland's first professional role after graduating from college was in 2011, where he played the role of Ian DeForge in The Bus at 59e59 Theaters. The show opened on October 4, 2011, and closed on October 31, 2011.

In 2012, Roland played the role of Nato Obenkrieger from August 16, 2012, to September 2, 2012, in a staged workshop of The Black Suits, a musical by Joe Iconis in The Berkshires at the Barrington Stage Company. In this production, he played alongside Ben Platt, who he would again star beside in Dear Evan Hansen. Roland reprised this role in 2013 from October 27, 2013, to November 24, 2013, in Los Angeles, California, for the show's world premiere at the Center Theatre Group.

In April 2013, Roland participated in the first reading of Be More Chill, wherein he read the role of Michael. He then departed the production and re-auditioned for the lead in 2015 when it was casting for its world premiere, whereupon he did not get cast. Around this time, he also became involved in the as then Untitled PPL Project. Starting in July 2014, Roland participated in readings and workshops of the show that would become Dear Evan Hansen, playing the role of Jared Kleinman. The show made its premiere in Washington, D.C. at the Arena Stage and ran from July 10, 2015, to August 23, 2015.

While in Washington, D.C. for the workshop and original production of Dear Evan Hansen, and Roland was also cast as Collin in the independent film One Penny. Principal photography occurred in 2015. The film premiered at the DC Independent Film Festival in February 2017. He was nominated for Best Supporting Actor at the Northern Virginia International Film and Music Festival in 2017.

In 2016, Roland reprised his role as Jared when Dear Evan Hansen went Off-Broadway for a limited engagement run at the Second Stage Theatre. Previews began March 26, 2016. The show opened on May 1, 2016, and ran until May 29, 2016. After selling out its Off-Broadway run, the show then transferred to Broadway at the Music Box Theatre. Previews began November 14, 2016 and the show opened on December 4, 2016. Roland departed the show on June 10, 2018.

In 2017, Roland was approached by the showrunners of Billions after seeing his performance in Dear Evan Hansen. He was offered an audition for a guest role, which turned into the recurring role of Winston, who Roland portrayed starting in season 3 of Billions.

On April 13, 2018, it was announced that Roland would play the role of Jeremy Heere in Joe Iconis' Be More Chill Off-Broadway limited engagement run at the Pershing Square Signature Center. Previews began July 26, 2018. The show opened August 9, 2018 and closed on September 30, 2018, after a one-week extension. Through Ghostlight Records, Roland released a new song called "Loser Geek Whatever" that had been introduced to the show as the new act 1 finale for its Off-Broadway run. After its sold out Off-Broadway run, Roland reprised the role when the show then transferred to Broadway at the Lyceum Theatre. Previews began February 13, 2019. The show opened March 10, 2019 and closed August 11, 2019.

In 2021, he played the role of Zeke Matthews in the studio cast recording of Goosebumps The Musical: Phantom of the Auditorium. He starred alongside Krystina Alabado and Noah Galvin

Personal life 
On November 7, 2018, Roland became engaged to his longtime girlfriend, Stephanie Wessels. They were married in June 2022.

Credits

Theatre

Film

Television

Awards and nominations

References

1989 births
21st-century American male actors
American male film actors
American male musical theatre actors
American male stage actors
American male television actors
Grammy Award winners
Living people
Male actors from New York City
People from the East Village, Manhattan
People from Locust Valley, New York
Singers from New York City
Steinhardt School of Culture, Education, and Human Development alumni